The Foday Lion F22 (雄师F22) is a midsize pickup truck that is manufactured and sold by Foday. It is based on the same platform as the Foday Landfort SUV and was rebadged as the SAF Striker, Dongfeng Yufeng P16 and Dayun Pika. An electric version called the Kandi K32 was produced by Kandi Technologies from November 2021 for the North American market.

Overview

The Foday Lion F22 was launched on the Chinese market in the second quarter of 2015 as a crew-cab only pickup.
Additional models of the Foday Lion F22 featuring a transmission supplied by Punch Powerglide was launched in April 2018 with pre-production started in March 2018.

Powertrain
There are three engines available for the Foday Pickup Lion F22, same as the engines offered for the Landfort. Both engines are mated to a five-speed manual transmission with rear-wheel drive as standard and optional four-wheel drive.

A five-speed manual transmission and six-speed automatic transmission is available, with four-wheel drive offered as standard.

Markets

Malaysia
Enggang Keramat Automobile in Malaysia launched a Malaysian car brand called SAF in April 2016. SAF was named after the arrangement of Muslims in prayer. The SAF lineup consists of rebadged versions of models from Foday, with the Lion F22 pick-up truck rebadged as the SAF Striker while still looking identical to the Foday model. The Foday Lion F22 was built at Oriental Assemblers in Tampoi, Johor, the same company that also assembles Chery products in Malaysia.

United States
Kandi America, the US subsidiary of China's Kandi Technologies Group, introduced the K32 as its first all-wheel-drive off-road EV in November 2021. The Kandi K32 is based on the same vehicle body as the Foday Lion F22, and was marketed as an all-electric dual motor 4-wheel drive UTV. Both models are equipped with a dual-motor, all-wheel-drive powertrain an output of  according to Kandi.

References

External links
 

Cars introduced in 2015
2010s cars
Cars of China
Pickup trucks
Rear-wheel-drive vehicles
All-wheel-drive vehicles